The Korean Day Parade is an annual event that takes place in New York City. The event usually takes place on the first Saturday of October.

References

Culture of New York City
Korean-American culture in New York City
Parades in New York City